Lisabeth H. Muhrer is a Norwegian handball player. She played 27 matches for the Norwegian national team between 1971 and 1977.  She participated at the 1975 World Women's Handball Championship, where the Norwegian team placed 8th.

References

Year of birth missing (living people)
Living people
Norwegian female handball players